Look Up Child is the third studio album by American contemporary Christian music singer and songwriter Lauren Daigle. It was released on September 7, 2018, through Centricity Music. The album received the Grammy Award for Best Contemporary Christian Music Album at the 2019 Grammy Awards. It was nominated for Top Christian Album at the 2019 Billboard Music Awards. The album has spent 44 weeks at No. 1 on the Christian Albums chart, the longest reign of the 2010s.

Background
In an interview with Billboards Jim Asker, Daigle said "I don't shy away from singing about my faith. I think it conveys honesty, and people see authenticity. More people are going to relate to my music if it's sincere. I believe that wholeheartedly. That's how you reach people that might not have felt that [the Christian genre] was their home before. I want this to be such a record of joy, such a record of hope, that people experience a childlikeness again. In the time of making this record, I had to remember who I was as a child. I want people to reflect on, 'The innocence of my childhood ... how do I see myself through those eyes again? How do I love myself like that again? Where's that joy? Where's that hope?"

Release and promotion

Singles
"You Say" was released as the lead single from the album on July 13, 2018. It impacted Christian radio on July 9, 2018. The song launched into the top five of the US iTunes Sales Chart upon its release, and debuted at No. 53 on the Billboard Hot 100, making it Daigle's first entry on the chart, where it reached a peak of No. 29. It was released to Top 40 radio on January 15, 2019. "You Say" has spent 100 weeks atop the Billboard Hot Christian Songs chart, the longest of any artist in the chart's history.

"Look Up Child" was released as the second promotional single. The song debuted at No. 33 on the Hot Christian Songs chart, and has reached a peak of No. 3. It was released to Christian radio on January 4, 2019, as the second single from the album.

"Rescue" was released to Christian radio on July 12, 2019, as the third single from the album. It peaked at No. 2 on the Christian Songs chart and No. 12 on the Bubbling Under Hot 100. The single was scheduled to be released to Hot AC radio on July 22, 2019, but was released on August 19, 2019.

"Still Rolling Stones" impacted Christian radio on April 10, 2020, as the fourth single from the album.

Promotional singles
"Still Rolling Stones" was released on August 10, 2018, as a promotional single. The song debuted at No. 17 on the Hot Christian Songs chart. It peaked at No. 4.

Commercial performance
Look Up Child debuted at No. 3 on the US Billboard 200 with 115,000 album-equivalent units, of which 103,000 were pure album sales. It is the highest-charting album by Daigle, and the highest-charting Christian album overall since Hard Love by Needtobreathe reached No. 2 on the chart in 2016. The album became the highest-charting Christian album by a woman on the Billboard 200 since LeAnn Rimes' You Light Up My Life peaked at No. 1 in 1997.

As of June 2019, the album has sold 362,000 copies in the U.S.

The album was certified Platinum by the RIAA on November 6, 2019.

Reception

Critical response

Look Up Child received widespread acclaim from music critics. Chris DeVille of Stereogum compared Daigle to English singer Adele, noting that "[f]rom her smoky powerhouse vocals to the tastefully inoffensive arrangements they dominate, her record could easily be mistaken for Adele." At CCM Magazine, Mark Geil rated the album five stars out of five, remarking how "This isn't a retread of How Can It Be. The new album is ballad-heavy, so expect passion but not tempo. At times, Daigle's Adele-inspired vocal affectations are a little over-the-top, but her delivery remains earnest. The piano is bright, and the album shines brightest in its playful moments, like "Still Rolling Stones" and the reggae-infused "Your Wings"." Concluding the review with "This is heartfelt record that heralds a strong return from one of Christian music's finest."

Luchae Williams from Gateway News affirmed that "Lauren Daigle's sophomore offering proves that you don't need dramatics, in order to create a masterpiece. Daigle's voice is enchanting and one can't help but admire the excellence in which she bobs and weaves through each song with her smoky smooth tone." Kevin Davis of New Release Today wrote "All of the songs are memorable and personal, and these moving recordings are poignant songs of reflection. Every song is emotionally captivating, and Lauren's powerful and gorgeous vocals keep me hanging on every word she sings. The standout songs each feature an engaging and emotive musical style while phrasing her prayer-filled lyrics in a creative and personal way, making it one of my top albums of the year."

Year-end lists

Accolades

Track listing

Credits and personnel
Credits adapted from Tidal.

 Lauren Daigle – lead vocals, background vocals
 Morgan Harper Nichols – background vocals
 Dwayne Larring – guitars
 Dwan Hill – organ, piano
 Paul Mabury – drums, piano, programming
 Jason Ingram – piano, programming
 Tony Lucido – bass
 Akil Thompson – guitars
 Roland Barber – trombone
 David Davidson – strings
 David Angell – strings
 Connie Ellisor – strings
 Mary Kathryn Van Osdale – strings
 Karen Winkelmaan – strings
 Janet Darnall – strings
 Jenny Bifano – strings
 WeiTsun Chang – strings
 Zeneba Bowers – strings
 Zach Casebolt – strings
 Alicia Engstrom – strings
 Kristin Wilkinson – strings
 Monisa Angell – strings
 Elizabeth Lamb – strings
 Seanad Chang – strings
 Sari Reist – strings
 Julie Tanner – strings
 Matt Walker – strings
 Certaine Booker – strings
 Craig Nelson – strings
 Jack Jezzioro – strings
 Carrie Bailey – strings
 Allison Hoffman – strings
 July Tanner – strings
 Emily Nelson – strings
 Quentin Flowers – strings

Charts

Weekly charts

Year-end charts

Decade-end charts

Certifications

References

2018 albums
Centricity Music albums
Lauren Daigle albums